Robert Allen (March 15, 1811 – August 5, 1886) was a career officer in the United States Army, serving as a brigadier general during the American Civil War.

Early life and career
Allen was born in tiny West Union, Adams County, Ohio, and was educated in the public schools. He received an appointment to the United States Military Academy and graduated in 1836, ranking 33rd out of 49 cadets. He was assigned as a second lieutenant in the 2nd U.S. Artillery and assigned to garrison duty in various outposts.

He saw his first combat during the Mexican–American War, where he received a brevet promotion to major for his actions at the Battle of Cerro Gordo. Allen was transferred to the Quartermaster's Department, and was eventually promoted to the chief quartermaster at Benicia, California, for the Department of the Pacific with the permanent rank of major.

Civil War service
At the outbreak of the Civil War, Allen was reassigned to the Department of the Missouri, where he was again chief quartermaster, as well as a colonel. Becoming recognized for his efficiency, he was soon promoted to command the supplies for the entire Mississippi Valley. From his headquarters in Louisville, Kentucky, Allen supervised the Federal supplies for all the region's major campaigns, including Vicksburg and Atlanta. He was able to secure a wide variety of surplus railcars from various Northern railroads and arranged to have them ferried across the Ohio River from Jeffersonville, Indiana, and used for military purposes to transport food and supplies to the field armies along former Confederate railways.

As a result of his performance, he was promoted to brigadier general and given command all quartermaster operations west of the Mississippi River, except for California. Allen ranked only behind Quartermaster General Montgomery C. Meigs (a fellow USMA 1836 graduate) in terms of responsibility and influence. His efficiency in large scale logistics helped ensure that the Federal armies in his theater of war were much better equipped and fed than their Confederate opponents.

On January 16, 1866, President Andrew Johnson nominated Allen for the award of the brevet grade of major general to rank from March 13, 1865, and the U.S. Senate confirmed the award on March 12, 1866. On July 17, 1866, President Johnson nominated Allen for the award of the brevet grade of major general, U.S. Army, also to rank from March 13, 1865, and the U.S. Senate confirmed the award on July 23, 1866. He was mustered out of the volunteer service on September 1, 1866.

Postbellum
After the war, Allen stayed in the Regular Army until his retirement on March 21, 1878, as the army's assistant quartermaster general, at the permanent grade of colonel, spending some $111 million during his lengthy career.

Allen died in Europe while traveling, and was buried in Chène-Bougeries Cemetery in Geneva, Switzerland.

See also

 List of American Civil War generals (Union)
 Louisville in the American Civil War

Notes

References
 Eicher, John H., and David J. Eicher, Civil War High Commands. Stanford: Stanford University Press, 2001. .
 Warner, Ezra J., Generals in Blue: Lives of the Union Commanders, Baton Rouge: Louisiana State University Press, 1964, pp. 2–3, .
 

1811 births
1886 deaths
People from Columbiana County, Ohio
People of Ohio in the American Civil War
American military personnel of the Mexican–American War
Members of the Aztec Club of 1847
Union Army generals
United States Military Academy alumni
Quartermasters